The following are the New Wave Awards given by the Metro Manila Film Festival.

History
In 2010, the film festival had undergone some changes. One change is that the festival format will give a tribute to independent "indie" films. For the first time in the 36 editions of the Metro Manila Film Festival, it paid tribute to the independent filmmakers in the country by featuring five indie films in addition to the eight mainstream movie entries in the 36th Metro Manila Film Festival.

In September 2011, Atty. Francis Tolentino, chairman of the Metropolitan Manila Development Authority (MMDA) changed the category name of "Indie" films to "New Wave" films to make it sound better and more attractive to hear, as well as including "Student Short Film Category" for the first time. The New Wave category starts during the 37th Metro Manila Film Festival in 2011.

In 2016, they announced that there would no longer be a distinction made between "mainstream" and "indie" films in the MMFF and the New Wave Category was dissolved.

Indie Films awards

36th Metro Manila Film Festival
Best Indie Film: Presa - Adolf Alix, Jr.

New Wave awards

37th Metro Manila Film Festival
Winners:

Best Full-Length Film: Pintakasi - Imee Marcos and Nelson Caguila
Best Student Film: Payaso - De La Salle Lipa
Mate - Colegio de San Juan de Letran
Best Actress: Iza Calzado - HIV
Best Actor :JM De Guzman - Pintakasi

Gender Sensitivity Award: HIV - Neil Tan (Full-Length Category)
Speechless - Miriam College (Student Category)
Special Jury Prize: Biyahe ni Barbie - Kookai Labayen of De La Salle-College of Saint Benilde

38th Metro Manila Film Festival
Winners:

Best New Wave Full-Length Film: The Grave Bandits - Tyrone Acierto
Special Jury Prize: Ad Ignorantiam
Best New Wave Actor: Allan Paule - Gayak
Best New Wave Actress: Liza Dino - In Nomine Matris
Gender Sensitivity Award: In Nomine Matris - Mr. Will Fredo
Best New Wave Director Award: Tyrone Ancierto - The Grave Bandits

Short Film Category
Best Student's Short Film Award: Pukpok - De La Salle University
Most Gender Sensitive Award: Manibela - Far Eastern University
Special Jury Prize: Tagad - University of San Carlos

1st CinePhone Film Festival
Luzon: Monthsary - Polytechnic University of the Philippines
Promdi - Don Bosco Youth Center
Visayas: Two Minutes - University of San Carlos
License to Drive - Christian Academy of Bacolod
Mindanao: The Boy, the Girl and the Traffic Man - Ateneo de Davao University
Bulgaran sa Daan - Philippine Nikkei Jin Kai International High School

39th Metro Manila Film Festival
Winners:

Best Picture: Dukit
Best Director: Armando Lao - Dukit
Best Actor: Wilfredo Layug, Bor Ocampo, Bambalito Lacap - Dukit
Best Actress: Agot Isidro - Mga Anino ng Kahapon
Most Gender Sensitivity Award: Island Dreams
Special Jury Prize: Mga Anino ng Kahapon

Student Short Film Special Jury Prize: #NoFilter
Student Short Film Most Gender-Sensitive Film: Hintayin Mo sa Seq. 24
Animation Best Picture: Kaleh and Mbaki
Animation Special Jury Prize: Ang Lalong ni Kulakog

40th Metro Manila Film Festival
Winners:

Best Picture: Magkakabaung
Best Director: Jason Paul Laxamana, Magkakabaung
Best Actor: Allen Dizon, Magkakabaung
Best Actress: Zsa Zsa Padilla, M (Mother's Maiden Name)
Best Supporting Actor: Kristoffer King, Maratabat (Pride and Honor)
Best Supporting Actress: Gloria Sevilla, M (Mother's Maiden Name)
Special Jury Prize: M (Mother's Maiden Name)
Best Student Film: Bundok Chubibo by Glenn Barit
Student Film Special Jury Prize: Kalaw by Immy Rempis
Best Animation Film: An Maogmang Lugar by Mary Espedido
Animation Film Special Jury Prize: Cherry by Dustin Uy

3rd CinePhone Film Festival Winner
Luzon: MAYA by Arenz Dionela - De La Salle - College of Saint Benilde

41st Metro Manila Film Festival
Best Picture – ARI: My Life with a King
Best Director – John Paul Su, Toto
Best Actor – JM de Guzman, Tandem & Francisco Guinto, ARI: My Life with a King
Best Supporting Actor – Thou Reyes, Toto
Best Supporting Actress – Bibeth Orteza, Toto
Best Screenplay – Robert Tantingco, ARI: My Life with a King
Special Jury Prize – Toto
Manila Bulletin Entertainment Best Picture – ARI: My Life with a King
Best Short Film – Mumu by Jean Cheryl TagyamonShort Film Special Jury Prize – Daisy by Brian ReyesManila Bulletin Entertainment Best Short Film – Momento by Jan-Kyle Nieva
Best Animation Film – Buttons by Marvel Obemio, Francis Ramirez & Jared GarciaAnimation Film Special Jury Prize – Lights Lights by Rivelle MallariManila Bulletin Entertainment Best Animation Film – Geo by John Aurthur Mercader'

References

External links
IMDB: Metro Manila Film Festival
Official website of the Metro Manila Film Festival

New Wave Awards

nl:Metro Manila Film Faestival
tl:Paligsahan ng mga Pelikula ng Kalakhang Maynila